Purahanda Kaluwara (Death on a Full Moon Day) is a 2001 Sri Lankan Sinhala drama film directed and produced by Prasanna Vithanage. It stars Joe Abeywickrama and Priyanka Samaraweera in lead roles along with Linton Semage and Mahendra Perera. Music composed by Nadeeka Guruge. The film has received mainly positive reviews. It is the 967th film in Sri Lankan cinema.

Synopsis
In a draught-stricken land marred by ethnic conflict, the sons of the rural poor are dying in a bitter civil war.

However, Wannihami, the blind old man, knows that rain will come soon.
On the Buddhist holiday of the full moon, the body of Bandara, Wannihami's soldier son, is brought home in a sealed coffin. The rains fall on the day Bandara is buried. But Wannihami refuses to sign the papers which entitles the family to Government compensation.

Despite pressure from his desperate community, Wannihami still retains clarity of vision which transcends his blindness. He decides to dig up his son's sealed coffin, even though he knows it will invalidate the compensation claim. His greater purpose is to believe that the war cannot kill his son.

Cast
 Joe Abeywickrama as Vannihamy
 Priyanka Samaraweera as Sunanda
 Linton Semage as Sunanda's husband
 Mahendra Perera as Village Officer
 Nayana Hettiarachchi as Yamuna
 Kumara Karunananda as Pala
 Harshajith Abeysuriya as Vannihamy's Grandson 
 K. A. Milton Perera as Schoolmaster

Release
With the Supreme Court ruling that the post of competent authority was illegal, the film was finally allowed to be released on fifth circuit from 28 July. However, the screening was delayed again when minister Sarath Amunugama, made the order under section 6 of the NFCSL Act of 1971 that the exhibition of the film had been deferred.

Box office
The film recorded the highest gate collection at the Colombo Regal cinema and earned Rs. 2,420,284.00 within 61 days to break the previous box office record set by Saroja by Somaratne Dissanayake which earned Rs. 2,414,000.00 after running for 126 days. Within last 50 days, the film earned Rs. 7,621,643.34 showing in thirteen theatres around the country.

Accolades
The main actor, Joe Abeywickrama won Best Actor award at 12th Singapore International Film Festival for his role "Wannihami". In 1991, the film won Grand Prix award, Jury award and NETPAC at 19th Amiens International Film Festival as well as International Film Critic's award at Fribourg International Film Festival in the same year.

References

External links
 Official Site - Prasanna Vithanage
 

1997 films
Sinhala-language films
1990s war drama films
Films about the Sri Lankan Civil War
Films set in Sri Lanka (1948–present)
Sri Lankan drama films
Films directed by Prasanna Vithanage
Films produced by Prasanna Vithanage
Films with screenplays by Prasanna Vithanage
1997 drama films